The Battle of Delebio was a battle of the Wars in Lombardy. It occurred on 18 and 19 November 1432, near Delebio, in the Valtellina. It was an aftermath of the occupation of Brescia and the Valle Camonica by the armies of the Republic of Venice, led by Francesco Bussone, Count of Carmagnola.

Prelude
The Venetian troops under Giorgio Corner had invaded the Valtellina in 1431, in order to secure the Republic's northern borders and favour their trade towards Germany. On 18 November 1432 the army of Filippo Maria Visconti, duke of Milan, with more than 400 horse and an unspecified infantry under the condottiero Niccolò Piccinino, marched alongside the Lake Como to defy the Venetians. Among the commanders of the Venetian troops was Bartolomeo Colleoni, which later became one of the most famous condottiero.

Battle
The first clash occurred that same day, when Venetians lost c. 300 infantry to push back a surprise attack on their camp. The following morning the camp was attacked by Piccinino from the West and by the Ghibellines of Valtellina, under Stefano Quadrio, from the East. The Venetians were crushed, most of their commanders being imprisoned. The Venetian losses amounted to 1,800 cavalry and 3,500 infantry, with c. 2,700 prisoners (5,000 casualties and 7,000 prisoners according to other sources).

Sources

See also
Wars in Lombardy

1432 in Europe
1430s in the Holy Roman Empire
15th century in the Republic of Venice
Delebio
Delebio
Battles in Lombardy
Delebio